Events in the year 1880 in Iceland.

Incumbents 

 Monarch: Christian IX
 Minister for Iceland: Johannes Nellemann

Events 

 May – The funeral of Icelandic independence movement leader Jón Sigurðsson takes place.

Births 

 8 January – Guðrún Lárusdóttir, politician
 24 February – Einar Arnórsson, politician
 5 April – Þorsteinn Þorsteinsson, economist
 19 June – Jóhann Sigurjónsson, playwright

References 

 
1880s in Iceland
Years of the 19th century in Iceland
Iceland
Iceland